Iranolacerta is a genus of wall lizards of the family Lacertidae.

Species
Iranolacerta brandtii  – Brandt's Persian lizard 
Iranolacerta zagrosica  – Zagros Mountains lacerta

Nota bene: A binomial authority in parentheses indicates that the species was originally described in a genus other than Iranolacerta.

References

Further reading
Arnold EN, Arribas OJ, Carranza S (2007). "Systematics of the Palaearctic and Oriental lizard tribe Lacertini (Squamata: Lacertidae: Lacertinae), with descriptions of eight new genera". Zootaxa 1430: 1–86. (Iranolacerta, new genus, p. 46).

 
Lizard genera
Taxa named by Edwin Nicholas Arnold
Taxa named by Oscar J. Arribas
Taxa named by Salvador Carranza